The d2 Test of Attention is a neuropsychological measure of selective and sustained attention and visual scanning speed. It is a paper and pencil test that asks participants to cross out any letter "d" with two marks around above it or below it in any order. The surrounding distractors are usually similar to the target stimulus, for example a "p" with two marks or a "d" with one or three marks. The original version of the test was created by Brickenkamp (1981) in Germany as a cancellation task.

References

Further reading

Cognitive tests
Neuropsychological tests